Hazbin Hotel is an American adult animated musical series created by Vivienne "VivziePop" Medrano. The series revolves around Charlie Morningstar, princess of Hell, on her quest to find a way for demons to be "rehabilitated" and allowed into Heaven. She opens a rehabilitation hotel that offers demons a chance at redemption and to be better people. The pilot, released to YouTube on October 28, 2019, was made entirely by freelance animators and was largely financed by Medrano's Patreon followers. Its first season was produced by independent entertainment company A24. By August 2020, the show had developed a dedicated fanbase, with the 31-minute pilot receiving over 83 million views as of February 2023, a rise from the pilot's 32 million viewers in May 2020.

The popularity and success of the pilot allowed Medrano to create a spinoff series called Helluva Boss, which premiered on October 31, 2020. The series features a different cast of characters within the same in-universe setting.

Premise
The series follows Charlie Morningstar (voiced by Jill Harris), the princess of Hell, as she sets about fulfilling her seemingly impossible dream of opening a hotel called the "Happy Hotel," which aims to rehabilitate sinners. Due to overpopulation, Hell goes through an annual purge once a year, where angels descend from Heaven and kill demons. Charlie finds this upsetting, and wants to find a more peaceful solution to the overpopulation problem. Her goal is to have her clients "check out" from Hell as redeemed souls and be accepted into Heaven.

With the help of her devoted manager and girlfriend, Vaggie (Monica Franco), and their reluctant first patron, pornographic film actor Angel Dust (Michael Kovach, pilot), she's determined to make her dream become a reality. But when her proposal on live television goes awry, her plan attracts the attention of the powerful "Radio Demon" Alastor (Edward Bosco) who, despite finding her belief in redemption laughable, wants to help Charlie run the hotel for his own amusement. To help out with the hotel, Alastor summons Niffty, the hotel's housekeeper, and Husk, the hotel's bartender.

Characters

Episodes

Pilot (2019)
{{Episode table
| total_width = 
| background = #3CB371 
| title = 
| director = 
| writer = 
| airdate = 
| airdateT = Original release date
| country = U.S.
| episodes =

{{Episode list
| Title           = That's Entertainment
| DirectedBy      = Vivienne Medrano
| WrittenBy       = Dave Capdevielle, Raymond Hernandez & Vivienne Medrano
| OriginalAirDate = 
| ShortSummary    = Charlie Magne, the princess of Hell, pursues her seemingly impossible goal of rehabilitating demons to peacefully reduce overpopulation in Hell. She opens a hotel in hopes that patients will be "checking out" into Heaven. While most of Hell mocks her goal, her devoted girlfriend, Vaggie, and their first test subject, adult film star Angel Dust, stick by her side. When Alastor, a powerful entity known as "The Radio Demon" reaches out to Charlie to assist in her endeavors, her crazy dream is given a chance to become a reality.

Musical numbers: "I'm Always Chasing Rainbows", "Inside of Every Demon is a Rainbow", and "Alastor's Reprise"
| LineColor       = 3CB371
}}
}}

Other media
Webcomics
In July 2020, a webcomic titled "Dirty Healings" which showed how Angel Dust learned of the hotel, was completed, containing twenty-two pages and hosted on the official website. Another comic titled "A Day in the Afterlife", which focused on Alastor's daily life in Hell, was posted to the website on October 19, 2020, containing sixteen pages.

"Addict" song and music video
"Addict" is an animated music video released on July 17, 2020 on Medrano's YouTube channel, based on and featuring the Silva Hound song of the same name. It centers around Angel Dust's relations with his best friend, Cherri Bomb, his abusive boss, Valentino, and their experiences with addiction. The song was performed by Michael Kovach and Kelly "Chi-Chi" Boyer. Tito W. James of Comicon.com described the video as giving viewers a "deeper look" at the lives of Cherri Bomb and Angel Dust, and praised the "world of Hazbin," as he called it, for being "paradoxically provocative and empathetic". The song ranked as the #3 dance song on iTunes on July 21, 2020. Additionally, the song reached number 14 on the US Dance/Electronic Songs chart, number four on the Dance/Electronic Digital Songs chart, and number 77 on the Dance/Electronic Songs Year-End.

 Helluva Boss 
A spin-off series, Helluva Boss, unveiled its first season on October 31, 2020, almost one year after the release of its own pilot. Helluva Boss takes place in the same universe as Hazbin Hotel, but it has a different cast of characters and story. As Medrano described it, while both shows share the same setting, Hazbin Hotel is about redemption and consequences of past actions, while Helluva Boss follows "characters and societies that already exist in Hell", focusing on relationships between characters.

Production and release

Some characters of the pilot had been around for years when Medrano began working with people at SVA on what would later become Hazbin Hotel. Originally, the pilot was meant to be an adult comedy "with a raunchy, demonic aesthetic". It took over six months to write the episode, and over two years (from 2017 to 2019) to animate it, with teasers released in that ensuing period to garner an audience of fans. The series contains various LGBTQ characters. This includes a gay character named Angel Dust, a bisexual character named Charlie, a lesbian character named Vaggie, and an asexual character named Alastor.

On October 28, 2019, the pilot was released, and it gained 54 million views by early February 2021.

On August 7, 2020, A24 picked up Hazbin Hotel for the production of a TV series. In January 2021, in a white paper about the increase in adult animation, John Evershed, founder of Mondo Media, described the series as a rare exception to shows on YouTube that are picked up by companies as a "long form TV series". He argued that the show generated enough attention and views to interest A24 in producing the show as a TV series.

In February 2021, Medrano told Insider that she was surprised the show had gotten so big, saying that the fandom of Hazbin Hotel rivals those of shows with multiple seasons, even with only a pilot released, and that it "hit a chord with people" due to its art style, angst, and drama. Furthermore, she expressed excitement in the direction of the show, noting the demand for her content. In a Twitter thread the same month, Medrano clarified that she was not "abandoning" Hazbin Hotel, and was working on comics for the series in the meantime.

On December 21, 2021, the official Hazbin Hotel Twitter account teased the release of the first season. Cast members from the pilot, including Elsie Lovelock, Michael Kovach, Krystal LaPorte, and Michelle Marie individually announced on their respective Twitter accounts that they were not asked to return for the A24 production, though showed support for the show despite their removal. Medrano said that she loves her characters "more than anything" and that they are "in good hands". It was also later reported that a number of voice actors used in the pilot including Michael Kovach, Elsie Lovelock, Gabriel C. Brown, Krystal LaPorte, Michelle Marie, and Josh Tomar would not be reprising their roles in the main series and would be replaced with new voice actors.

From February 22, 2022 onwards, the official Hazbin Hotel Twitter account unveiled redesigns of several main characters, including Charlie, Alastor, Angel Dust, and several others. On March 3, 2022, Medrano said that many of the artists who worked on the pilot would be returning for the first season, and argued that the "indie spirit of the pilot lives on." Along with SpindleHorse Toons, Princess Bento Studios, a studio jointly owned by Bento Box Entertainment and Princess Pictures, will be producing the series.

On October 27, 2022, the show's main social media account announced the release date, set for the summer of 2023.

On October 28, 2022, for the 3rd anniversary of the Hazbin Hotel pilot, the VivziePop YouTube channel released the first teaser for the show.

Reception
The series' pilot episode has been critically acclaimed for its animation quality, music, and characters, even by those who are more critical of the show itself. Stephen Novak from The Oswegonian student newspaper praised the animation, writing, and characters in Hazbin Hotel. However, he criticized the songs, saying "while Hazbin Hotel will certainly not appeal to everyone, those who can appreciate good animation and fun characters will certainly find themselves tortured by what is likely to be a long wait until the next episode." Another reviewer, Matthew Field, argued that the pilot was part of the "animation renaissance" on YouTube.

Matt Smith of another student newspaper, The Harbinger, had similar thoughts. Smith praised the show as a "hilariously dark look" into life in Hell while praising the voice acting, singing, and animation. At the same time, he pointed out the show is clearly "not for kids", noting the drug use and sexual references as well as strong language and violence. Smith notes that the animation is crisp and lively but not perfect. He states that the show has great pacing as well. In addition, Lidia Vassar of the MSU Reporter praised the show, noting its "raunchy sense of humor and quirky art style." She also stated that she was looking forward to future episodes, enjoyed the "diversity of character designs," and stated that it is clear that the show's creators "put a lot of time and heart into this project." In December 2019, in an article about the current state of adult animation, CBR animation critic Reuben Baron stated that while the pilot episodes of Hazbin Hotel and Helluva Boss had garnered "some warranted criticism" because of their inappropriate and edgy humor, they are still "clear labors of love from an animation standpoint". Another critic on CBR, Nerissa Rupnarine, pointed out that Alastor is on the small list of "canon asexual characters" within animation.

Charlie Ceates of Cultured Vultures stated that Hazbin Hotel is an example of how "traditional methods of television production are changing," and posited the possibility of YouTube being used to change the "balance of power between the creator and networks" in favor of creators. Ceates also stated that the show represents a "clear change in traditional media" and called the pilot a "well-designed bit of animation which deserves a watch," which is echoed by others who say it will have a positive influence on independent animation going forward. Some even said that the success of Hazbin Hotel led to the success of Helluva Boss''. Reviewer Sean Cubillas praised the show for "quirky, ambitious, and dark humor" and some of the "fastest, wittiest, and raunchiest dialogue ever seen in independent animation".

Notes

References

Citations

Sources

External links

American adult animated web series
2010s American adult animated television series
2010s American black comedy television series
2010s American LGBT-related comedy television series
2010s American musical comedy television series
2019 web series debuts
2010s American satirical television series
American adult animated comedy television series
American adult animated musical television series
American television series premieres
Adult comedy web series
Fiction about the afterlife
Hell in popular culture
Demons in television
Independent animation
American comedy webcomics
LGBT-related animated web series
English-language television shows
Television series by A24
Television series set in hotels
Television shows adapted into comics
Television series about demons
Genocide in fiction
2010s YouTube series
2020s YouTube series
Upcoming animated television series
Hazbin Hotel